Skitten Broch was an Iron Age broch located between the villages of Killimster and North Killimster in Caithness, Scotland.

Location
The RAF Skitten base was built on the remains of Skitten Broch.

Description
Skitten broch was destroyed in the 1940s during the building of the nearby Killimster aerodrome, from which Operation Freshman departed.

History
Sir Francis Tress Barry partially excavated Skitten broch in 1904. Ahead of its destruction in 1940, a second excavation was carried out by Charles S. T. Calder in 1940.

References

Brochs
Scheduled monuments in Scotland
Archaeological sites in Caithness